Olam may refer to:

 Olam International, a food and agri-business company based in Singapore
 Olam (network), a network of Jewish and Israeli development and humanitarian organizations 
 Justin Olam (born 1993), Papua New Guinean rugby league footballer

See also 
 
 Alam, a name
 El (deity), or El olam